GM Crops & Food: Biotechnology in Agriculture and the Food Chain is a quarterly peer-reviewed scientific journal covering agricultural and food biotechnology. It was established in 2010 as GM Crops, obtaining its current name in 2012. It is published by Taylor & Francis and the editors-in-chief are Naglaa A. Abdallah (Cairo University) and Channapatna S. Prakash (Tuskegee University). According to the Journal Citation Reports, the journal has a 2017 impact factor of 2.913.

References

External links

Publications established in 2010
Taylor & Francis academic journals
Biotechnology journals
Genetically modified organisms in agriculture
Quarterly journals
English-language journals